Bob Sanders (born December 5, 1953) is an American football coach. He was previously the defensive coordinator for the Orlando Apollos of the Alliance of American Football (AAF). He coached the Buffalo Bills from 2009 to 2012 after coaching for four years with the Green Bay Packers, four years with the Miami Dolphins and 11 years at the University of Florida. He was let go by the Packers following the 2008 season.

Sanders was hired on January 29, 2009, by the Buffalo Bills as defensive line coach. He was dismissed, along with the entire Bills coaching staff on December 31, 2012. Sanders worked under Steve Spurrier for 11 years at Florida. He also worked at Miami under the veteran defensive coordinator Jim Bates for five  years, from 2001 to 2004 coaching linebackers and, in 2005, as defensive ends coach in Green Bay.

On February 2, 2015, it was announced that Sanders had been hired as the linebackers coach with the Arizona Cardinals.

In 2019, Sanders reunited with Spurrier as the defensive coordinator of the Apollos.

On March 1, 2022, Sanders reunited with Arians as the outside linebackers coach for the Tampa Bay Buccaneers.

References

External links
Oakland Raiders biography
Buffalo Bills biography

1953 births
Living people
East Carolina Pirates football coaches
Florida Gators football coaches
Buffalo Bills coaches
Oakland Raiders coaches
Green Bay Packers coaches
Miami Dolphins coaches
Orlando Apollos coaches
National Football League defensive coordinators
Tampa Bay Buccaneers coaches